Palo Pinto is a census-designated place (CDP) and unincorporated community and county seat in Palo Pinto County, Texas, United States. This was a new CDP for the 2010 census with a population of 333.

Geography
Palo Pinto is located at  (32.769149, -98.300766).

History

When legislation calling for organization of Palo Pinto County was passed in 1856, a community was designated to be built within 5 miles of the center of the county to serve as the seat of government. The county was formally organized in May 1857, and on August 18 of the same year, the first session of the county court was held, when the plans for the new county seat were discussed and enacted. The community, then called Golconda, was laid out soon thereafter, and received its post office in March 1858. Around this time, the town (and, soon after, post office) were renamed Palo Pinto.

The first Palo Pinto County Courthouse was built in 1857, and a two-story stone jail was built soon after. By 1860, Palo Pinto had a hotel, a law firm, several saloons, and its own school. The Civil War, however, had a dire effect on commerce in the community, forcing several businesses to close. Over the next decade or so, it evolved into a shipping point for the local ranching industry. The county's first newspaper opened in 1876, and throughout the 1870s, the town remained the center of government and commerce, and the only town and principal settlement in Palo Pinto County.

In 1880, Palo Pinto was bypassed by the Texas and Pacific Railway. Although it suffered, the population remained above 400 and it retained several businesses. The county seat has remained in Palo Pinto, though it was surpassed as the largest town in the county by Mineral Wells many years ago. The current Palo Pinto County Courthouse, located on US 180 at the center of town, was built in 1940. The population reached a high mark of 550 in 1947 before declining to around 400, a mark it has maintained fairly consistently ever since.

Demographics

2020 census

As of the 2020 United States census, there were 276 people, 41 households, and 37 families residing in the CDP.

Education
Palo Pinto is served by three school districts; children in prekindergarten through sixth grade attend the Palo Pinto ISD school, and seventh through 12th grade attend Gordon ISD or Mineral Wells ISD schools.

Climate
The climate in this area is characterized by relatively high temperatures and evenly distributed precipitation throughout the year.  The Köppen climate classification system describes the weather as humid subtropical, Cfa.

References

External links
 Handbook of Texas Online entry for Palo Pinto
 

Unincorporated communities in Palo Pinto County, Texas
Unincorporated communities in Texas
County seats in Texas
Populated places established in 1857
1857 establishments in Texas